Legally Blind is a 2017 Philippine television drama series broadcast by GMA Network. It premiered on the network's Afternoon Prime line up and worldwide on GMA Pinoy TV from February 20, 2017, to June 30, 2017, replacing Hahamakin ang Lahat.

NUTAM (Nationwide Urban Television Audience Measurement) People in Television Homes ratings are provided by AGB Nielsen Philippines.

Series overview

Episodes

February 2017

March 2017

April 2017

May 2017

June 2017

References

Lists of Philippine drama television series episodes